Mia Shaheb Moidan is one of the oldest Khakah Sharif of Dhaka. It was built in 1709 by Al Hajj Shah Sufi Abdur Rahim Shaheed (K C), who was known as Mia Shaheb.

History 
Abdur Rahim Rizvi, Islami Scholar came to Dhaka from Kashmir through Murshidabad, close to 1730. He was follower of "Nokshibandi Tarikah". When he settled in "Mia Shaheb Maidan" it was a barren field. But later, one of the oldest Muslim majority community raised surrounding his "Aastana" – dwelling. People of that locality out of respect called him "Mia Shaheb". From then on the place is known as "Mia Shaheb Moidan".

A madman wounded him in 1738. He had 7 wounds. After suffering for 33 days, he died at the age of 84, on the 9th day of Ramadan. Though Mia Shaheb Moidan is now a part of "Lakshmi Bazar", still now the place is known after him by some.

Architectural value and present condition 

Now Mia Shahed Moidan became the Waqfah of Shah Shaheb.  The whole Waqfah is known as "Shah Shaheb Bari Jam-e Masjid"

Now this Waqfah contains:
 a 3 Storeyed Aastana's Mosque (established in 1909)
 a Graveyard
 a Building of Motwali Room
 a Mazar Sharif of Mia Shaheb
 a Goddin Sheen's Huzur Khana (established in 1824)

Present address 

Now it is situated at 56-57 Municipal Street, Lakshmibazar, Dhaka – 1100.

References
 

Buildings and structures in Dhaka